The Battle of Chuncheon was one of a series of coordinated attacks beginning on 25 June 1950 that marked the beginning of the Korean War.

Battles of the Korean War
Battles and operations of the Korean War in 1950 
Battles of the Korean War involving South Korea 
Battles of the Korean War involving North Korea
History of Gangwon Province, South Korea
June 1950 events in Asia